GalNAc5-diNAcBac-PP-undecaprenol beta-1,3-glucosyltransferase (PglI) is an enzyme with systematic name UDP-alpha-D-glucose:(GalNAc-alpha-(1->4))4-GalNAc-alpha-(1->3)-diNAcBac-diphospho-tritrans,heptacis-undecaprenol 3-beta-D-glucosyltransferase. This enzyme catalyses the following chemical reaction

 UDP-alpha-D-glucose + [GalNAc-alpha-(1->4)]4-GalNAc-alpha-(1->3)-diNAcBac-diphospho-tritrans,heptacis-undecaprenol  UDP + [GalNAc-alpha-(1->4)]2-[Glc-beta-(1->3)]-[GalNAc-alpha-(1->4)]2-GalNAc-alpha-(1->3)-diNAcBac-diphospho-tritrans,heptacis-undecaprenol

This enzyme is isolated from the bacterium Campylobacter jejuni.

References

External links 

EC 2.4.1